The 1986–87 Illinois Fighting Illini men's basketball team represented the University of Illinois.

Regular season
The 1986–87 season saw the addition of an outstanding group of young players to the roster. Guards Steve Bardo, Kendall Gill and Larry Smith joined forward Nick Anderson in a highly touted recruiting class. This group produced another 20-win season (23-8) and a trip to the NCAA Tournament, where Illinois was beaten 68-67 by Austin Peay in arguably the school's most shocking upset.

This marked the first season in Big Ten Conference basketball history where two teams finished with 30 or more victories. This season also marks the NCAA's first unified 3-point line of 19 feet 9 inches after 5 years of experimentation.

Roster

Source

Schedule
												
Source																
												

|-
!colspan=12 style="background:#DF4E38; color:white;"| Non-Conference regular season

	

|-
!colspan=9 style="background:#DF4E38; color:#FFFFFF;"|Big Ten regular season	

|-
!colspan=9 style="text-align: center; background:#DF4E38"|NCAA Tournament

|-

Rankings

Player stats

Awards and honors
Ken Norman
Associated Press 2nd team All-American
United States Basketball Writers Association 2nd team All-American
National Association of Basketball Coaches 3rd team All-American
Team Most Valuable Player 
Fighting Illini All-Century team (2005)
Kendall Gill
Fighting Illini All-Century team (2005)

Team players drafted into the NBA

Rankings

References

Illinois Fighting Illini
Illinois
Illinois Fighting Illini men's basketball seasons
1986 in sports in Illinois
1987 in sports in Illinois